This page lists all described species of the spider family Ctenizidae accepted by the World Spider Catalog :

† Baltocteniza

† Baltocteniza Eskov and Zonstein, 2000
 † B. kulickae Eskov and Zonstein, 2000

Cteniza

Cteniza Latreille, 1829
 C. genevieveae Canard, 2018 — France (Corsica)
 C. moggridgei O. Pickard-Cambridge, 1874 — France, Italy
 C. sauvagesi (Rossi, 1788) (type) — France (Corsica), Italy

Cyrtocarenum

Cyrtocarenum Ausserer, 1871
 C. cunicularium (Olivier, 1811) (type) — Greece (incl. Crete, Rhodes), Turkey
 C. grajum (C. L. Koch, 1836) — Greece

† Electrocteniza

† Electrocteniza Eskov and Zonstein, 2000
 † E. sadilenkoi Eskov and Zonstein, 2000

References

Ctenizidae